Bryan Arion is a Mexican actor and model best known for his roles in television series such as Selena: The Series and The Last Ship.

Early life 
Arion was born in Chilpancingo, Guerrero, Mexico, a city known for its drug cartels. His family was a victim of cartel-related violence so at age 5 he and his mother fled to the US. He grew up in North Carolina where he experienced racism and bullying because of his ethnicity.

Career 
Arion booked one of his first roles on the soap opera Days of Our Lives. He also went on to appear in the action-drama series The Last Ship. Arion starred as Ray in Selena: The Series, which was released in 2020. He has also appeared in commercials.

Personal life 
Arion is a practitioner of Brazilian Jiu-Jitsu and Muay Thai. Arion is also a musician who plays guitar and piano.

Filmography

References 

Living people
21st-century Mexican male actors
Mexican male models
Year of birth missing (living people)